XHLBC-FM/XELBC-AM is a radio station on 95.7 FM and 730 AM in Loreto, Baja California Sur. The station is branded as Radio La Giganta.

History
XELBC-AM 730 received its concession on May 8, 1995. It was a 10 kW daytimer.

XELBC was authorized to move to FM in 2011.

References

Radio stations in Baja California Sur
Radio stations established in 1995
Radio stations in Mexico with continuity obligations